Estonia Theatre is an historic building in Tallinn, Estonia, which houses the Estonian National Opera and the Estonian National Symphony Orchestra.

The original Jugendstil building was designed by Finnish architects Armas Lindgren and Wivi Lönn. It was built as a national effort with the leadership of Estonia society in 1913 and was opened to the public on 24 August. At the time, it was the largest building in Tallinn.

The theatre was heavily damaged in the Soviet air raid on Tallinn on 9 March 1944. It was reconstructed in a classical and Stalinist style, and reopened in 1947.In 1946, it served as the home of the newly created Tallinn Ballet School and was the location of the debut of one of the graduates of the school's first class, Helmi Puur. She was the prima ballerina of the theater between 1954 and 1956, 1958 and 1960, and 1964 to 1966.

The building has two large auditoriums in two separate wings. A chamber hall was opened in 2006. Also the Concert Hall is located in the building. In 1997, the hall was thoroughly renovated.

See also
 Estonian Drama Theatre

References 

 Estonia majast  (Russian, Finnish, English, images only)
 http://www.classictic.com/en/Tallinn/Estonian-National-Opera

1913 establishments in Estonia
Buildings and structures in Tallinn
Theatres in Tallinn
Opera houses in Estonia
Kesklinn, Tallinn
Art Nouveau architecture in Estonia
Tourist attractions in Tallinn
Theatres completed in 1913
Music venues completed in 1913
Theatres completed in 1947
Music venues completed in 1947
Art Nouveau theatres
Heritage listed buildings and structures in Estonia